Endotricha dumalis is a species of snout moth in the genus Endotricha. It was described by Wang and Li in 2005, and is known from China (Guangxi).

The wingspan is about 20 mm. The forewings are dark-mauve, irrorated with black scales. The hindwings are the same color as the forewings, but the costal margin is greyish white suffused with fewer black scales.

Etymology
The specific name is from the Latin dumandalis and refers to the lateral lobes of the juxta with many spines in the male genitalia.

References

Moths described in 2005
Endotrichini